California's 11th State Senate district is one of 40 California State Senate districts. It is currently represented by Democrat Scott Wiener of San Francisco.

District profile 
The district encompasses the northern San Francisco Peninsula, including the consolidated city-county of San Francisco and extreme northern San Mateo County.

All of San Francisco County

San Mateo County – 17.5%
 Colma
 Daly City
 South San Francisco – 27.4%

Election results from statewide races

List of senators 
Due to redistricting, the 11th district has been moved around different parts of the state. The current iteration resulted from the 2011 redistricting by the California Citizens Redistricting Commission.

Election results 1992 - present

2020

2016

2012

2008

2004

2000

1996

1992

See also 
 California State Senate
 California State Senate districts
 Districts in California

References

External links 
 District map from the California Citizens Redistricting Commission

11
Government of San Francisco
Government of San Mateo County, California
Government in the San Francisco Bay Area